A scientific control is an experiment or observation designed to minimize the effects of variables other than the independent variable (i.e. confounding variables). This increases the reliability of the results, often through a comparison between control measurements and the other measurements. Scientific controls are a part of the scientific method.

Controlled experiments
 

Controls eliminate alternate explanations of experimental results, especially experimental errors and experimenter bias. Many controls are specific to the type of experiment being performed, as in the molecular markers used in SDS-PAGE experiments, and may simply have the purpose of ensuring that the equipment is working properly. The selection and use of proper controls to ensure that experimental results are valid (for example, absence of confounding variables) can be very difficult. Control measurements may also be used for other purposes: for example, a measurement of a microphone's background noise in the absence of a signal allows the noise to be subtracted from later measurements of the signal, thus producing a processed signal of higher quality.

For example, if a researcher feeds an experimental artificial sweetener to sixty laboratories rats and observes that ten of them subsequently become sick, the underlying cause could be the sweetener itself or something unrelated. Other variables, which may not be readily obvious, may interfere with the experimental design. For instance, the artificial sweetener might be mixed with a dilutant and it might be the dilutant that causes the effect.  To control for the effect of the dilutant, the same test is run twice; once with the artificial sweetener in the dilutant, and another done exactly the same way but using the dilutant alone.  Now the experiment is controlled for the dilutant and the experimenter can distinguish between sweetener, dilutant, and non-treatment.  Controls are most often necessary where a confounding factor cannot easily be separated from the primary treatments.  For example, it may be necessary to use a tractor to spread fertilizer where there is no other practicable way to spread fertilizer.  The simplest solution is to have a treatment where a tractor is driven over plots without spreading fertilizer and in that way, the effects of tractor traffic are controlled.

The simplest types of control are negative and positive controls, and both are found in many different types of experiments. These two controls, when both are successful, are usually sufficient to eliminate most potential confounding variables: it means that the experiment produces a negative result when a negative result is expected, and a positive result when a positive result is expected.

Negative

Where there are only two possible outcomes, e.g. positive or negative, if the treatment group and the negative control both produce a negative result, it can be inferred that the treatment had no effect. If the treatment group and the negative control both produce a positive result, it can be inferred that a confounding variable is involved in the phenomenon under study, and the positive results are not solely due to the treatment.

In other examples, outcomes might be measured as lengths, times, percentages, and so forth. In the drug testing example, we could measure the percentage of patients cured. In this case, the treatment is inferred to have no effect when the treatment group and the negative control produce the same results. Some improvement is expected in the placebo group due to the placebo effect, and this result sets the baseline upon which the treatment must improve upon. Even if the treatment group shows improvement, it needs to be compared to the placebo group. If the groups show the same effect, then the treatment was not responsible for the improvement (because the same number of patients were cured in the absence of the treatment). The treatment is only effective if the treatment group shows more improvement than the placebo group.

Positive
Positive controls are often used to assess test validity. For example, to assess a new test's ability to detect a disease (its sensitivity), then we can compare it against a different test that is already known to work. The well-established test is a positive control since we already know that the answer to the question (whether the test works) is yes.

Similarly, in an enzyme assay to measure the amount of an enzyme in a set of extracts, a positive control would be an assay containing a known quantity of the purified enzyme (while a negative control would contain no enzyme). The positive control should give a large amount of enzyme activity, while the negative control should give very low to no activity.

If the positive control does not produce the expected result, there may be something wrong with the experimental procedure, and the experiment is repeated. For difficult or complicated experiments, the result from the positive control can also help in comparison to previous experimental results. For example, if the well-established disease test was determined to have the same effect as found by previous experimenters, this indicates that the experiment is being performed in the same way that the previous experimenters did.

When possible, multiple positive controls may be used—if there is more than one disease test that is known to be effective, more than one might be tested. Multiple positive controls also allow finer comparisons of the results (calibration, or standardization) if the expected results from the positive controls have different sizes. For example, in the enzyme assay discussed above, a standard curve may be produced by making many different samples with different quantities of the enzyme.

Randomization

In randomization, the groups that receive different experimental treatments are determined randomly. While this does not ensure that there are no differences between the groups, it ensures that the differences are distributed equally, thus correcting for systematic errors.

For example, in experiments where crop yield is affected (e.g. soil fertility), the experiment can be controlled by assigning the treatments to randomly selected plots of land. This mitigates the effect of variations in soil composition on the yield.

Blind experiments

Blinding is the practice of withholding information that may bias an experiment. For example, participants may not know who received an active treatment and who received a placebo. If this information were to become available to trial participants, patients could receive a larger placebo effect, researchers could influence the experiment to meet their expectations (the observer effect), and evaluators could be subject to confirmation bias. A blind can be imposed on any participant of an experiment, including subjects, researchers, technicians, data analysts, and evaluators. In some cases, sham surgery may be necessary to achieve blinding.

During the course of an experiment, a participant becomes unblinded if they deduce or otherwise obtain information that has been masked to them. Unblinding that occurs before the conclusion of a study is a source of experimental error, as the bias that was eliminated by blinding is re-introduced. Unblinding is common in blind experiments and must be measured and reported. Meta-research has revealed high levels of unblinding in pharmacological trials. In particular, antidepressant trials are poorly blinded. Reporting guidelines recommend that all studies assess and report unblinding. In practice, very few studies assess unblinding.

Blinding is an important tool of the scientific method, and is used in many fields of research. In some fields, such as medicine, it is considered essential. In clinical research, a trial that is not blinded trial is called an open trial.

See also
False positives and false negatives
Designed experiment
Controlling for a variable
James Lind cured scurvy using a controlled experiment that has been described as the first clinical trial.
 Wait list control group

References

External links

Scientific method
 Experiments